Coulsdon Sixth Form College is a Sixth Form College for 16 to 19 year-olds based in Old Coulsdon, London and is built on the site of Purley High School for Boys.

Courses
The College offers predominantly GCE A Level and BTEC Level 3 courses, with provision for students to enrol on an Intermediate Programme (pre-A Level) and GCSE re-sit courses in English and Maths. The College has also recently introduced a T Level in Laboratory Science.

Students at Coulsdon Sixth Form College have the option to ‘mix and match’ A Levels with BTEC Level 3 courses, which allows them to customise their study programmes to best match their interests and abilities. The range of courses covers: Visual and Performing Arts, Music, Business, Travel, Sport, Science, IT, Health and Social Care, Mathematics, Humanities, Languages and Media. This programme of study is unique to the College.

Facilities
The College is housed in a three-storey university style building. It has learning facilities such as a Learning Resource Centre (LRC) with 90 computers.

Coulsdon Sixth Form College also offers students other facilities such as a Refectory, a theatre, sport hall, gym, netball and tennis courts and a playfield.

Activities
Students from the College can take part in the College Activities Programme and get involved in extra-curricular clubs and activities. These change each term but usually include a mix of skill-based activities, recreational sports and career orientated clubs. Progression Week in June enables Lower Sixth students to play a role in an action-packed week of activities, including external trips and a variety of College-based experiences, such as visits to theatres, places of historic interest, but also personal fitness sessions, creative workshops and activities to help with career planning.

Sports
In addition to the floodlit Astro Turf football/hockey pitch, tennis courts and extensive playing fields on site, the College has a Sports Centre comprising a sports hall and fitness suite.  There is also a Football Academy, run by FTF Academy. This offers students the chance to benefit from football coaching in addition to their main course at College.

Performing Arts
The College has three studios, two dedicated to Music, and a theatre. There are annual shows which showcase a variety of musical and theatrical productions throughout the year enable students to express their performance skills.

References

External links
 Coulsdon Sixth Form College homepage

Education in the London Borough of Croydon
Sixth form colleges in London